is a Japanese politician.

Overview 
He is a politician of the Democratic Party of Japan (DPJ), a member of the House of Councillors in the Diet (national legislature). A native of Mitsugi District, Hiroshima and graduate of Keio University, he was elected to the House of Representatives for the first time in 2000 as a member of Ichirō Ozawa's Liberal Party after running unsuccessfully in 1996 as a member of the New Frontier Party. After the Liberal Party merged with the DPJ, he won the 2003 re-election but lost the 2005 re-election. In 2007, he was elected to the House of Councillors for the first time.

References

External links 
  in Japanese.

1959 births
Living people
Politicians from Hiroshima Prefecture
Keio University alumni
Members of the House of Representatives (Japan)
Members of the House of Councillors (Japan)
New Frontier Party (Japan) politicians
20th-century Japanese politicians
Liberal Party (Japan, 1998) politicians
Democratic Party of Japan politicians
21st-century Japanese politicians